Toppen af Poppen is a Danish reality television series broadcast on Danish television station TV 2 as part of The Best Singers series and is based on the Dutch series De beste zangers van Nederland. Ten seasons have been broadcast thus far with the inaugural series launched on 7 February 2011.

Season 1
The first Danish season of Toppen af Poppen included the following artists: Erann DD, Lars H.U.G., Szhirley, Dorthe Kollo, Anna David and Jokeren.

On 18 March 2011, a compilation album entitled Toppen af Poppen was released including some of the best performances from the series reaching #4 on the Danish Albums Chart.

Season 2
Due to the huge popularity of the first series, a second series was launched the same year and started on 23 August 2011 also on TV 2.

On 3 October 2011, a compilation album of best performances was released under the title Toppen af Poppen 2 reaching the top of the Danish Albums Chart. The songs in bold are own songs interpreted by the original artist.

Season 3
The third season of the show was filmed in Mallorca in April 2012. Season 3 was broadcast starting 14 August 2012 and continued until 25 September on TV 2.

On 24 October 2012, a compilation album of best performances was released under the title Toppen af Poppen 3.

The songs in bold are own songs interpreted by the original artist.

Season 4
The fourth season of Toppen af Poppen was shown in the autumn of 2014. The show was recorded on the Danish island of Bornholm.

Season 5
The fifth season premiered on TV 2 in the autumn of 2015. The show was recorded in May 2015 at Skagen.

Season 6
The sixth season of Toppen af Poppen premiered on August 28, 2016 on TV 2. The show was recorded at Samsø in the spring of 2016.

Season 7
The seventh season of Toppen af Poppen premiered on August 27, 2017 on TV 2. The show was recorded at Kerteminde.

Season 8
The eighth season of Toppen af Poppen premiered on August 26, 2018 on TV 2. The show was recorded at Stege.

Season 9
The ninth season of Toppen af Poppen premiered on August 18, 2019 on TV 2. The show was recorded at Fanø.

Season 10
The ninth season of Toppen af Poppen premiered on August 30, 2020 on TV 2. The show was recorded at Tisvilde. This tenth season of the show is different, celebrating its 10 years with an anniversary format with 25 artists from previous seasons on rotation in every episode.

Episode 1: August 30, 2020

Episode 2: September 6, 2020

Episode 3: September 13, 2020

Episode 4: September 20, 2020

Episode 5: September 27, 2020

Episode 6: October 4, 2020

Episode 7: October 11, 2020

Discography

Albums

Extended plays

See also
The Best Singers (series)

References

Danish reality television series
2010s Danish television series
2011 Danish television series endings
TV 2 (Denmark) original programming